The R342 road is a regional road in Ireland, located in southern County Galway, part of the Carna Road.

References

Regional roads in the Republic of Ireland
Roads in County Galway